was a town located in Nita District, Shimane Prefecture, Japan.

As of 2003, the town had an estimated population of 7,746 and a density of 40.89 persons per km2. The total area was 189.42 km2.

On January 31, 2005, Yokota, along with the town of Nita (also from Nita District), was merged to create the town of Okuizumo.

Dissolved municipalities of Shimane Prefecture